Malabar Branch Library is a branch library of the Los Angeles Public Library located in the Boyle Heights section of Los Angeles, California.

The Malabar Branch began in 1914 as a book depository in a Sunday school room at the Brooklyn Heights Methodist Church on the corner of Evergreen Avenue and Malabar Street.  The original collection consisted of approximately 900 books that were checked out on the honor system.

In 1925, a bond issue was passed by Los Angeles voters providing funds for the construction of 14 new branch libraries, including the current Malabar Branch.  Construction on the new Mediterranean Revival-Spanish Colonial Revival building started in 1926, and the new library was opened in May 1927.  The building was designed by architect William Lee Woollett.

The Malabar Branch was damaged in the 1987 Whittier Narrows earthquake and was closed.  The branch was extensively renovated and reopened in 1992 with separate reading rooms for adults and children, a multipurpose room and a patron services room.

In 1987, the Malabar Branch and several other branch libraries in Los Angeles were added to the National Register of Historic Places as part of a thematic group submission.   The application noted that the branch libraries had been constructed in a variety of period revival styles to house the initial branch library system of the City of Los Angeles.  With respect to the Malabar Branch, the application described the building as a one-story, brick structure designed in a revival style reminiscent of rural Latin America.

The Malabar Branch is a Los Angeles Historic-Cultural Monument.

See also

Los Angeles Historic-Cultural Monuments on the East and Northeast Sides
List of Registered Historic Places in Los Angeles
Los Angeles Public Library

References

External links

 Malabar Branch Library - Los Angeles Public Library
 History of Malabar Branch, 1949, written by the staff of the branch
 Malabar Branch History, 1936-1949
 History of Malabar Branch, 1949-1959
 History of Malabar Branch, 1959-1969
 Jew in the literature of the last decade: A selected list of books by Jews or relating to them, a booklist created by the Malabar Branch Library staff in the 1920s to meet the needs of Boyle Heights' large Jewish community

Library buildings completed in 1927
Libraries in Los Angeles
Libraries on the National Register of Historic Places in Los Angeles
Los Angeles Historic-Cultural Monuments
Mediterranean Revival architecture in California
Spanish Colonial Revival architecture in California
Boyle Heights, Los Angeles